A linear data set (LDS) is a type of data set organization used by IBM's VSAM computer data storage system.

The LDS has a control interval size of 4096 bytes to 32768 bytes in increments of 4096. A LDS does not have embedded control information, because it does not contain control information, the LDS cannot be accessed as if it contained individual records.

Addressing within an LDS is by Relative Byte Address (RBA), which allows it to be used by systems such as IBM Db2 or the Operating system. The benefit of this is that systems such as the OS can access multiple disk spindles and view it as a single storage implementation. The limitations of this, though, is that this does not make this particularly useful to higher level abstraction levels. Data In Virtual (DIV) and Window services provide an alternative method to direct use of VSAM to access an LDS with a CI size of 4096.

See also
Key Sequenced Data Set
Entry Sequenced Data Set
Relative Record Data Set

References
ASMGUIDE

Other citations

Computer file systems